The Men's sprint event of the 2015 UCI Track Cycling World Championships was held on 21–22 February 2015.

Results

Qualifying
The qualifying was held at 13:00.

1/16 finals
The 1/16 finals were held at 14:05.

1/8 finals
The 1/8 finals were held at 15:15.

1/8 finals repechage
1/8 finals repechage was held at 16:35.

Quarterfinals
Race 1 was started at 11:25, Race 2 at 12:00 and Race 3 at 12:35.

Race for 5th–8th places
The race for 5th–8th places was held at 13:05 .

Semifinals
Race 1 was held at 14:00, Race 2 at 14:45 and Race 3 at 15:05.

Finals
Race 1 was held at 15:30, Race 2 at 16:40 and Race 3 at 17:00.

References

Men's sprint
UCI Track Cycling World Championships – Men's sprint